A Christmas cantata or Nativity cantata is a cantata, music for voice or voices in several movements, for Christmas. The importance of the feast inspired many composers to write cantatas for the occasion, some designed to be performed in church services, others for concert or secular celebration. The Christmas story, telling of music of the angels and suggesting music of the shepherds and cradle song, invited musical treatment. Christmas cantatas have been written on texts in several other languages, such as Czech, Italian, Romanian, and Spanish.

Christmas cantata can also mean the performance of the music. Many choirs have a tradition of an annual Christmas cantata.

Theme

Different from Christmas oratorios, which present the Christmas story, Christmas cantatas deal with aspects of it. Bach's Christmas Oratorio, written for performance in Leipzig in 1734/1735 touches many of these themes. It consists of six parts, each part is a complete work and composed for the church service of a specific feast day. Bach structured the report from the Gospels which connects the parts to a whole, as told by the Evangelist, in six topics. In Parts I to IV he followed the Gospel of Luke, in Parts V and VI the Gospel of Matthew. In some instances he deviated from the prescribed readings, rather continuing the tradition of older works by Heinrich Schütz and others.

 Part I, Jauchzet, frohlocket!, for Christmas Day (25 December): Nativity of Jesus
 Part II, Und es waren Hirten in derselben Gegend, for the Second Day of Christmas (26 December): Annunciation to the shepherds, Glory to God, peace on earth
 Part III for the Third Day of Christmas (27 December): Adoration of the shepherds
 Part IV, Fallt mit Danken, fallt mit Loben, for New Year's Day (1 January): Naming of Jesus
 Part V for the first Sunday after New Year's Day: Biblical Magi
 Part VI for Epiphany (6 January): Adoration of the Magi

These themes appear also in cantatas of later composers.

History
Many Christmas cantatas – as cantatas in general – were written in the Baroque era for church services, related to the prescribed readings of the liturgical year. Cantata texts frequently incorporated Bible quotations and chorale. Chorale cantatas rely on the text of one chorale only. Later composers also set free text, poems and carols.

Italian baroque
The cantata form originated in Italy, alongside the oratorio. Carissimi's  pupil Marc-Antoine Charpentier brought the small-scale Latin Christmas oratorio to Paris (In nativitatem Domini canticum), while the vernacular Italian Christmas cantata was developed by composers such as Alessandro Stradella (Si apra al riso ogni labro 1675), Francesco Provenzale (Per la nascita del Verbo 1683) and Alessandro Scarlatti in Naples, Antonio Caldara in Vienna (Vaticini di pace 1713).

German baroque

Bach
The best known Christmas cantatas today are those of Johann Sebastian Bach, who composed several cantatas for the three days of Christmas in his three annual cantata cycles (1723 to 1725), also before and afterwards:
First Day
Christen, ätzet diesen Tag, BWV 63, 1713? 1716?
Gelobet seist du, Jesu Christ, BWV 91, 25 December 1724, on Luther's hymn
Unser Mund sei voll Lachens, BWV 110, 25 December 1725
Ehre sei Gott in der Höhe, BWV 197a, 25 December ?1728 (partly lost)
Gloria in excelsis Deo, BWV 191, 25 December 1745
Second Day
Darzu ist erschienen der Sohn Gottes, BWV 40, 26 December 1723
Christum wir sollen loben schon, BWV 121, 26 December 1724, on Luther's hymn
Selig ist der Mann, BWV 57, 26 December 1725
Third Day
Sehet, welch eine Liebe hat uns der Vater erzeiget, BWV 64, 27 December 1723
Ich freue mich in dir, BWV 133, 27 December 1724, on a hymn by Caspar Ziegler
Süßer Trost, mein Jesus kömmt, BWV 151, 27 December 1725

In the works of Bach's second cycle of chorale cantatas (1724), the text of the chorale is kept for the outer stanzas, but rephrased in poetry for arias and recitatives in the other stanzas. His late cantata Gloria in excelsis Deo is derived from the Gloria in his Missa in B minor, which he had composed for the court of Dresden in 1733 and would later incorporate in his Mass in B minor. Therefore, the cantata is for five parts and in Latin. The text of the liturgical Gloria begins with the angels' song, as a link to the Christmas story.

Other German Baroque composers
Gottfried Heinrich Stölzel composed for the season 1736/1737 a structure of six cantatas for six feast days around Christmas, similar to Bach's Christmas Oratorio, including Kündlich groß ist das gottselige Geheimnis. More of his Christmas cantatas were published in 2007 by Hofmeister. Christmas cantatas were also composed by Georg Gebel, Christoph Graupner, Andreas Hammerschmidt, Arnold Brunckhorst, Johann Samuel Beyer, Philipp Buchner, David Pohle, Johann Hermann Schein and Thomas Selle, among others.

Classical period
During the Age of Enlightenment, church music was less prominent. In 1796 Jakub Jan Ryba wrote Česká mše vánoční, which tells within the frame of a Mass a Christmas story in Czech, set in pastoral Bohemia.

Romantic period
During the romantic era, Felix Mendelssohn composed the chorale cantata Vom Himmel hoch based on Luther's hymn "", and Josef Rheinberger wrote  (The star of Bethlehem) on a text by his wife Franziska von Hoffnaaß. Christmas cantatas were also composed by Gerard von Brucken Fock (1900) and Charles H. Gabriel, among others.

20th century
In the 20th century, Benjamin Britten set in 1942 a sequence of carols as A Ceremony of Carols. His cantata Saint Nicolas, written in 1948, after World War II, has also been termed a Christmas cantata. Rudolf Mauersberger composed for the Dresdner Kreuzchor which he conducted, Eine kleine Weihnachtskantate (A little Christmas cantata). Ralph Vaughan Williams wrote Hodie, and Arthur Honegger composed as his last work Une cantate de Noël for the Basler Kammerchor and their founder Paul Sacher. He began his work with a setting of Psalm 130 and continued with carols. Christmas cantatas were also composed by Geoffrey Bush, Steve Dobrogosz, Geoffrey Grey, Iain Hamilton, Julius Harrison, Hans Uwe Hielscher, Mathilde Kralik, Ivana Loudová, Daniel Pinkham (1957), Ned Rorem, K. Lee Scott, Otto Albert Tichý and Arnold van Wyk, among others. A Christmas cantata outside the classical music tradition was the 1986 project The Animals' Christmas by Jimmy Webb and Art Garfunkel.

In 1995, Bruckner's Fest-Kantate Preiset den Herrn, WAB 16, has undergone an adaptation as Festkantate zur Weihnacht (festive Christmas cantata) for mixed choir with Herbert Vogg’s text "Ehre sei Gott in der Höhe".

21st century
In the 21st century, new Christmas cantatas have been written among others by Toshio Hosokawa and Graham Waterhouse.

Scoring 
All Christmas cantatas consist of several movements, most movements include solo and choral singing. The scoring can be chamber music to be performed by single singers and instruments, choir a cappella, and works for soloists, choir and orchestra. Several composers specifically asked for a children's choir. Trumpets feature prominently in many Baroque cantatas as the Royal instruments.

Cantatas 
The table uses abbreviations: S = soprano, MS = mezzo-soprano, A = alto, T = tenor, Bar = baritone, B = bass, childr = children's choir, Str = strings, Instr = instruments, Tr = tromba (trumpet), Co = horn, Cn = cornett, Tb = trombone, Ti = timpani, Fl = recorder, Ft = flauto traverso, Ob = oboe, Oa = Oboe d'amore, Oc = Oboe da caccia, Vn = violin, Va = viola, Vc = cello, Fg = bassoon, Org = organ, Bc = basso continuo

Literature 
 Alfred Dürr: Johann Sebastian Bach: Die Kantaten. Bärenreiter, Kassel 1999, 
 Werner Neumann: Handbuch der Kantaten J.S.Bachs, 1947, 1984, 
 Hans-Joachim Schulze: Die Bach-Kantaten: Einführungen zu sämtlichen Kantaten Johann Sebastian Bachs. Leipzig: Evangelische Verlags-Anstalt; Stuttgart: Carus-Verlag 2006 (Edition Bach-Archiv Leipzig)  (Evang. Verl.-Anst.),  (Carus-Verlag)
 Christoph Wolff/Ton Koopman: Die Welt der Bach-Kantaten Verlag J.B. Metzler, Stuttgart, Weimar 2006

References

 
17th-century music genres
18th-century music genres
19th-century music genres
20th-century music genres
21st-century music genres